Harrington Covered Bridge is a historic wooden covered bridge located at Conneaut Township, Erie County, Pennsylvania. It crosses the west branch of Conneaut Creek. It was constructed about 1870, and rebuilt in 1962.

It was listed on the National Register of Historic Places in 1980.

References 

Covered bridges on the National Register of Historic Places in Pennsylvania
Covered bridges in Erie County, Pennsylvania
Bridges completed in 1870
Wooden bridges in Pennsylvania
Bridges in Erie County, Pennsylvania
Tourist attractions in Erie County, Pennsylvania
National Register of Historic Places in Erie County, Pennsylvania
Road bridges on the National Register of Historic Places in Pennsylvania
King post truss bridges in the United States
1870 establishments in Pennsylvania